Sir William Powell, 1st Baronet (c. 1624 – 2 December 1680) was an English politician who sat in the House of Commons  in 1660.

Powell was born as William Hinson, the son of Thomas Hinson of Dubllin and his wife Anne Powell, daughter of Edward Powell of Fulham. His uncle, Sir Edward Powell, 1st Baronet of Pengethly, left him his estates on condition that he changed his name to Powell.

He sat on the bench as a Justice of the Peace for Middlesex from 1650 to 1654 and Herefordshie from 1677 to his death and appointed High Sheriff of Herefordshire for 1657–58.

In 1660, Powell was elected Member of Parliament for Herefordshire in the Convention Parliament. He was created baronet on 25 January 1661 under the recreated baronetcy of Pengethly.
 
Powell married firstly, Mary, Lady Brydges, widow of Sir John Brydges, 2nd Baronet of Wilton Castle, and daughter of John Pearle of Aconbury, in Herefordshire. He married secondly Katherine Zouch, daughter of Dr Richard Zouch, judge of the Admiralty. He had no male heir and the baronetcy became extinct on his death. His daughter Mary married Sir John Williams, 2nd Baronet, of Eltham.

References

1624 births
1680 deaths
People from Herefordshire
English MPs 1660
Year of birth uncertain
High Sheriffs of Herefordshire
Baronets in the Baronetage of England